The European Climate Initiative (EUKI) is a funding instrument of the  German Federal Ministry for Economic Affairs and Climate Action (BMWK). The overall objective of the EUKI is to promote cooperation in the European Union (EU) to reduce greenhouse gas emissions.

The European Climate Initiative finances cross-border climate action projects. of public and civil society actors such as non-governmental organizations, scientific institutes and municipalities. Currently (as of June 2022), the EUKI promotes and finances 157 projects in 31 European countries. More than 300 implementing organizations and implementing partners are active in the projects. The funding volume amounts to 79 million euros. The EUKI forms the link between the National and the International Climate Initiative.

History 
In November 2016, the German government decided to fund the European Climate Initiative and made funds available for the 2017 federal budget. In April 2017, the first EU-wide call for project ideas was launched, with 67 project proposals received and 22 projects selected for funding. In May 2017, the EUKI Secretariat established its office at the Deutsche Gesellschaft für Internationale Zusammenarbeit (GIZ). A few months later, in September 2017, the first projects started their work.

During the first EUKI annual conference in Berlin in February 2018, the publication of a second call for project ideas was announced. From 85 project outlines, EUKI subsequently selected 22 proposals for funding. A third ideas competition was launched in March 2019. Further call for project ideas followed in 2019, 2020 and 2021. From the 6th ideas competition, 25 projects were selected for funding. The 7th EUKI call for project ideas will start on 25 November 2022.

Objectives 

The overall objective of the EUKI is to promote cooperation within the European Union to reduce greenhouse gas emissions. The work focuses on three approaches to support public and civil society actors in climate action and to initiate a transformative change in Europe to mitigate greenhouse gases.

Specifically, the EUKI pursues three approaches:

 Raise awareness and bundle knowledge
 Build networks and share models of success
 Build capacities and bridges to EU funding

Project funding 

There are two ways to receive funding or contracts under the EUKI: The annual, EU-wide call for project ideas selects organizations with future-oriented ideas for European climate action. In addition, the German Federal Ministry for the Environment finances specific projects that pursue predefined climate policy goals. The target groups of the bilateral and multilateral measures to be funded are governments, local authorities, civil society, consumers and - where permitted under state aid law - the industry. Geographically there is a focus on cooperation with Central, Eastern, South Eastern and Southern Europe

Call for Project Ideas 

Once a year, the EUKI publishes a call for project ideas in which committed actors and cross-border networks within the EU can apply for funding. Innovative climate action ideas from non-governmental organizations, public authorities, non-profit companies and scientific and educational institutions are selected for funding. Projects are sought in which partners from two or more EU countries work together. The EUKI funds the majority of its projects through the call for project ideas which is implemented by the Deutsche Gesellschaft für Internationale Zusammenarbeit (GIZ) on behalf of the BMWK.

Tenders 

Within the framework of tenders the BMWK commissions selected projects and studies. These are intended to contribute to the direct implementation of agreements with EU partner countries and climate policy goals of the German government in Europe. The concept development for these projects takes place in consultation with the respective partner countries within the framework of bilateral initiatives. In addition, the ministry awards contracts for the scientific monitoring and evaluation of the EUKI as well as for the support of the BMWK in questions of EU climate policy.

EUKI Academy 

In addition to funding, EUKI supports the strengthening of methodological, technical and commercial competencies as well as the dissemination of knowledge on climate action. Corresponding training events are offered within the framework of the EUKI Academy. The EUKI also promotes the networking of implementers and thus contributes to the establishment of a community of practice of committed experts in climate action across professional and national borders.

EUKI regularly offers webinars on climate-relevant topics such as climate policy or structural change in coal regions. In addition, there are further training courses on methodological topics such as project management or public relations. EUKI also publishes results and studies of the funded projects.

Thematic priorities and project examples 

The European Climate Initiative promotes ideas for cross-border EU-wide climate action.

Projects funded include socially responsible structural change in coal regions, awareness-raising in schools, an exchange program for journalists, exchanges on national and European climate policy, and the strengthening of cycling in urban areas.

References